Your Best Friend is a 1922 American silent drama film written and directed by William Nigh. The film stars Vera Gordon, Harry Benham, Stanley Price, and Belle Bennett. The film was released by Warner Bros. on March 26, 1922. It is not known whether the film survives.

Plot
As described in a film magazine, Mrs. Esther Meyers (Gordon) moves from her modest home to one of the elite in the West End. Here she sees her daughter-in-law Aida (Bennett) and the latter's mother (Mason) squander her hard-earned savings on gay parties and teas. When she tries to mother her little niece or become part of her son's household, she is snubbed and rebuffed and called old-fashioned by Aida. Then her son Harry (Price) admits to absconding with a banks funds. To save him from jail, and to save the reputation of her other son Robert (Benham) whose ambition is to become a district attorney, Mrs. Meyers gives up all her money and sells her jewelry to make good the loss. Back to her former home she goes. It is here that a recognition of her true worth comes to Aida and they have a happy reconciliation.

Cast   
Vera Gordon as Mrs. Esther Meyers
Harry Benham as Robert Meyers
Stanley Price as Harry Meyers
Belle Bennett as Aida
Beth Mason as Aida's Mother
Dore Davidson as Morris

Box office
According to Warner Bros records, the film earned $132,000 domestically and $11,000 foreign.

References

External links

1922 films
1920s English-language films
Silent American drama films
1922 drama films
Films directed by William Nigh
American silent feature films
American black-and-white films
1920s American films